Marie Steichen (died September 2006) was a Democratic politician from Woonsocket, South Dakota, who gained fame for winning a local election two months after dying of cancer. In the general election of November 7, 2006 she defeated, by a vote of 100 to 64, the incumbent Republican candidate Merlin Feistner for the post of commissioner of Jerauld County in the U.S. state of South Dakota.

This was the first time she had stood for election for political office.  She and her husband Harold lived on a farm south of Lane, South Dakota. In the primary election, she had defeated Rick Easton of Wessington Springs by just one vote, 22–21.

See also
Mel Carnahan

References

Year of birth missing
2006 deaths
Deaths from cancer in South Dakota
Women in South Dakota politics
People from Jerauld County, South Dakota
South Dakota Democrats
21st-century American politicians
21st-century American women politicians
People from Woonsocket, South Dakota